The 40th World Cup season began in October 2005 and concluded at the World Cup finals in Åre, Sweden, in March 2006.  The schedule included a nearly month-long break in February for the 2006 Winter Olympics in Torino, Italy.

Benjamin Raich of Austria won his first overall title after finishing third in 2004 and second in 2005.  He added his second consecutive giant slalom discipline globe, and Michael Walchhofer also repeated as downhill champion.  Aksel Lund Svindal and Giorgio Rocca were each first-time winners in super G and slalom respectively.  Svindal edged Hermann Maier by only 2 points, denying the "Herminator" a sixth super G crown.

On the women's side, Janica Kostelić of Croatia won her third overall and slalom World Cup titles.  She won 9 races to become only the third skier ever to win races in all 5 disciplines in a single season (joining Marc Girardelli and Petra Kronberger).  Kostelić amassed 1970 World Cup points, a new women's record and second only to Hermann Maier's 2000 points in 2000.  Although Anja Pärson failed to win her third straight overall crown, she won 8 races while capturing her third giant slalom globe, and her 1662 points would have been enough to win the overall in any of the previous 6 seasons.  In her final season on the World Cup tour, Michaela Dorfmeister secured her second downhill and super G titles.

Calendar

Men

Ladies

Nations team event

Men

Overall

Downhill 

see complete table

In Men's Downhill World Cup 2005/06 all results count.

Super-G 

see complete table

In Men's Super G World Cup 2005/06 all results count.

Giant slalom 

see complete table

In Men's Giant Slalom World Cup 2005/06 all results count.

Slalom 

see complete table

Super combined 

see complete table

Women

Overall

Downhill

Super-G

Giant slalom

Slalom

Super combined

Nations Cup

Overall 

See also:
Alpine skiing at the 2006 Winter Olympics

Footnotes

References

External links
FIS-ski.com - World Cup standings - 2006

2005–06
World Cup
World Cup